Oliver John "Ollie" Payne (born 6 April 1999) is an English field hockey player who plays as a goalkeeper for Holcombe and the England and Great Britain national teams.

Club career

Payne plays club hockey in the Men's England Hockey League Premier Division for Holcombe.

International career
Payne was the goalkeeper of the tournament at the 2019 Sultan of Johor Cup. On 28 May 2021, he was selected as the first goalkeeper in the England squad for the 2021 EuroHockey Championship.

References

External links

Profile on England Hockey
Profile on Great Britain Hockey

1999 births
Living people
English male field hockey players
British male field hockey players
Male field hockey goalkeepers
Holcombe Hockey Club players
Men's England Hockey League players
Place of birth missing (living people)
Field hockey players at the 2020 Summer Olympics
Olympic field hockey players of Great Britain
Commonwealth Games bronze medallists for England
Commonwealth Games medallists in field hockey
Field hockey players at the 2022 Commonwealth Games
2023 Men's FIH Hockey World Cup players
Medallists at the 2022 Commonwealth Games